Gabat is a commune in the Pyrénées-Atlantiques department in south-western France.

It is located in the former province of Lower Navarre, in the Pyrenees. The local dialect is western bas-navarrais. Inhabitants are called Gabardiars.

Names 
Historically attested name (form)s are Gabat (1125), Sancta Maria de Bagad / Bagadh (1160), Gavat (12th century cartulary of Sorde), Bagat (1203), Gavat (1268), Gabat (1316 & 1413) and Nostre-Done de Gabat (1472, notaries of Labastide-Villefranche).

Population

See also 
 Communes of the Pyrénées-Atlantiques department

References 

Communes of Pyrénées-Atlantiques
Lower Navarre
Pyrénées-Atlantiques communes articles needing translation from French Wikipedia